WLLD (94.1 MHz, "WiLD 94.1") is a rhythmic CHR-formatted radio station licensed to Lakeland, Florida that serves the Tampa Bay area in Florida, and is owned by Beasley Broadcast Group. Although the target audience of WLLD is mainly people of ages 18–49, its main competitors are currently iHeartMedia's combo of Top 40 WFLZ ("93-3 FLZ"), and Urban Contemporary WBTP ("95.7 The Beat"), along with Cox's Top 40 WPOI ("Hot 101.5"). WLLD's transmitting facilities are in southeastern Hillsborough County near the "Four Corners" approximately 30 miles southeast of Tampa, while its studios are in St. Petersburg. The station can be picked up as far as Cape Coral, Leesburg, Orlando and Okeechobee.

Station history

94.1 FM
94.1 began broadcasting as WVFM on August 29, 1965 and aired an easy listening format. The station was off the air for almost a year between November 1966 and September 1967 while in the process of being sold. Easy listening remained the format at WVFM for almost three decades; the station changed its calls to WEZY in 1988. WEZY later evolved from pure Beautiful Music into Soft AC before changing to Smooth Jazz WSJT on July 1, 1995.

WiLD format
The kayfabe line is that the station was started by two friends, Josh and Brian, who had been drinking on Josh's father's boat claiming to have pirated radio waves. The duo bragged of their contraband and irregulated airwaves until they were bought and turned into what is now the station that is broadcast today. In reality, the station just had a very small budget to start with, often resulting in the same songs playing over and over again. Tone Lōc's "Wild Thing" was the first song the station had played over the air. The fictional friends would claim to have allegiance toward the song during their drunken stupor and continued to play the song repeatedly over the course of days. For the first few days the station was on the air, the song continued to be played in an effort to spark word of mouth attention.

At first, WLLD's musical direction included a balanced mix of hit-driven R&B/Hip-Hop and Dance tracks, mostly to counter rival WFLZ-FM, a move that would pay off up until WBTP (WFLZ's sister station) debuted. Today, the station's playlist is atypical of most rhythmics as it consists of mostly hip-hop and R&B hits, thus is considered to be a rhythmic crossover by "Billboard". It also has competition from Rhythmic-leaning Top 40/CHR WPOI, which debuted in July 2011.

WLLD was located on the 98.7 frequency from May 15, 1998, until 5:00 p.m. on August 19, 2009, when it swapped frequencies with smooth jazz station WSJT (now the current WPBB). The first song played after the switch was Tone Loc's "Wild Thing", the same first song that was played when WLLD was first launched in 1998 when it was on the 98.7 frequency.

On October 2, 2014, CBS Radio announced that it would trade all of their radio stations located in Charlotte and Tampa (including WLLD), as well as WIP (AM) in Philadelphia, to the Beasley Broadcast Group in exchange for 5 stations located in Miami and Philadelphia. The swap was completed on December 1, 2014.

The "Original 12"
These songs were part of the original line up at WLLD.  As previously mentioned, the budgetary restrictions on the station limited the songs that were played on the air. The following legendary line up was the result.

(No particular order)

Tone Loc - Wild Thing 
Bone Thugs'n'Harmony - Ghetto Cowboy 
Master P - Make em Say Ugh 
Jay-Z - Can I Get A.. 
Aaliyah - Are You That Somebody 
2 Live Crew - Me So Horny 
Sylk E. Fine - Romeo and Juliet 
Adam Sandler - Ode to My Car (Piece of S**t Car) 
Notorious B.I.G. feat. Puff Daddy & Mase - Mo Money Mo Problems 
Mýa - Take Me There 
Mýa - Movin' On 
Militia - Burn

The Last Damn Show and WiLD Splash
The Last Damn Show is an annual concert put on by WLLD.  It is put on in late October or early November every year since 1999.  The show got its title from being the "last damn show" before the world ended in Y2K; hence, in continuation with the world remaining unscathed. Past performers include Eminem, Lil Wayne, Destiny's Child, P. Diddy, Busta Rhymes, Bubba Sparxxx, Lil Jon and the Eastside Boyz, Trick Daddy, Luke, Ludacris, Kanye West, and Twista among others. The concert was originally held at The St. Pete Times Forum, but is held in other locations, such as Tropicana Field.  It has pulled in over 20,000 in attendance almost every year.

On the evening of September 11, 1999, WLLD broadcast the Last Damn Show concert live from 6 to 11 p.m. Because WLLD did not censor profane language and other instances of indecency from the broadcast, the Florida Family Association filed a complaint with the Federal Communications Commission (FCC). The Association wanted the FCC to revoke WLLD's license. The FCC fined WLLD owner Infinity Broadcasting (now the defunct CBS Radio) $7,000 the following year. Infinity filed an appeal, but the FCC denied the appeal in 2004.

WiLDsplash is the annual concert during spring break out on by WLLD in Clearwater Beach.  It has been a Bay Area staple since 2001 and pulls crowds in excess of 15,000 fans consistently.  Past performers Wiz Khalifa, Snoop Dogg, Busta Rhymes, Bubba Sparxxx, 50 Cent, Sean Paul, Buju Banton, JoJo, 112, Bone Thugs-n-Harmony, Ziggy Marley, Young Jeezy, Stephen & Damian Marley among others.

The 'WILD' branding
WLLD uses the "WiLD" branding in Tampa. The brand has since been trademarked by Clear Channel Communications years later since the debut of WLLD, which is due to Clear Channel owning KYLD/San Francisco, who has used the "WiLD" branding since their launch in 1992.

Like KYLD, when WLLD was started, the first song played was Tone-Loc's Wild Thing, hence the station's branding basis.

Station management
 Program Director Orlando Davis
 Music Director Christine Peters
 Programming Research Director 
 Promotions Director Tom Davis

References

External links
WiLD 94.1 Website

FCC History Cards for WLLD

LLD
Rhythmic contemporary radio stations in the United States
Radio stations established in 1967
LLD
1967 establishments in Florida